Anthony Eric Myint (born May 5, 1978, Falls Church, Virginia, United States) is an American restaurateur, chef, activist, author and food consultant based in the Mission in San Francisco, California.  He is a founder of Mission Chinese Food, "The Perennial", Mission Street Food, Mission Cantina, "Mission Burger", "Lt. Waffle", and "Commonwealth Restaurant". He is a pioneer in the environmental and charitable restaurant movement.

Activism

Myint is a leader in the movement to mobilize the restaurant industry toward healthy soil as a solution to the climate crisis. He is the 2019 winner of Basque Culinary World Prize for his non-profit work as Co-Founder of Zero Foodprint and Restore California a collaboration with the state government engaging consumers in the creation of a renewable food system through direct payments to farmers for their role in reversing global warming; the prize recognizes chefs for their contributions to gastronomy outside of the kitchen. Zero Foodprint was named 2020 Humanitarian of the Year by the James Beard Foundation.

Culinary accolades

Myint was named to Chow.com's 13 most influential people in the food world. and was selected Eater.com's empire builder of the year for San Francisco (2011).  Food & Wine Magazine listed Myint among the "Top 40 under 40" big thinkers in the food world for 2010. He was also Charitable Chef of the year by SF Weekly, and one of 7x7 Magazine's "Hot 20" for 2011.

In addition, he has co-written a cookbook with his wife, Karen Leibowitz, Mission Street Food: Recipes and Ideas from an Improbable Restaurant. The book was a New York Times Notable cookbook for 2011.

Pre-culinary career
Myint was raised in Annandale, Virginia the son of Chinese parents, who had immigrated from Burma. He attended the renowned Thomas Jefferson High School for Science and Technology, and graduated from Carleton College, majoring in Economics and Asian studies. After graduating from Carleton, Myint worked for three years in Northern Virginia, in market research, specializing in the travel industry.  In 2003, he embarked on a trip around world, eating his way across 31 countries and six continents, exposing himself to a diverse array of culinary traditions.

Culinary career
In 2004, Myint moved to San Francisco, California, where he began working as a line cook, and he eventually landed at Bar Tartine.  While working there, he began Mission Street Food, by using a food truck to launch his initial enterprise.  He expanded the business and moved to Lung Shan Chinese Restaurant, where on Thursday and Saturday nights Mission Street Food took place.  Myint also opened Mission Burger, within the Duc Loi supermarket, but this venture eventually closed.  Mission Street Food closed in June 2010, to be replaced by Mission Chinese Food, which opened in Lung Shan restaurant in July 2010 as a new incarnation of the restaurant-within-a-restaurant concept.  Mission Chinese Food was named one of San Francisco's top 100 restaurants by Michael Bauer of the San Francisco Chronicle.  Anthony Myint continues to work there alongside chef Danny Bowien, who was named a 2011 rising star chef by San Francisco Chronicle.  Mission Chinese Food was second on the list of the 10 Best New Restaurants in America, by Bon Appetit Magazine. In 2012, Myint and Bowien opened a second location of Mission Chinese Food in New York, on the Lower East Side of Manhattan. In 2013, Bon Appetit Magazine named Mission Chinese Food (both locations) the ninth-most important restaurant in the United States. Bowien and Myint opened a follow-up restaurant, Mission Cantina, in November 2013.

Anthony Myint, along with Bar Tartine alumni, Jason Fox, Xelina Leyba and Ian Muntzert opened a charitable fine-dining establishment, Commonwealth Restaurant, in August 2010 in San Francisco.  Commonwealth was named a James Beard Semifinalist in 2011 for Best New Restaurant.

Anthony Myint was the opening chef at "Mission Bowling Clu"b in San Francisco, which opened in early 2012. The menu features the reappearance of the Mission Burger. In 2013, Myint opened "Lt. Waffle" and "Greensalads.org" inside "Linea Caffe", also in San Francisco's Mission District, in partnership with Andrew Barnett.

In January 2016, Myint opened a new restaurant called "The Perennial", which prioritizes environmental sustainability with co-founder Karen Leibowitz. The Perennial is pledged to promote environmental sustainability in tandem with Zero Foodprint, which Myint founded with Chris Ying, former editor of Lucky Peach, and Peter Freed, environmental expert. In September 2017, Myint became co-chef of The Perennial with Michael Andreatta.

References

External links
 Missionchinesefood.com
 ZeroFoodprint.org
 Restore.Global
 theperennialsf.com
 Missionstreetfood.com
 Commonwealthsf.com

1978 births
Living people
American people of Burmese descent
American people of Chinese descent
American restaurateurs
American chefs
American male chefs
Food and drink in the San Francisco Bay Area
Thomas Jefferson High School for Science and Technology alumni
Carleton College alumni
People from Falls Church, Virginia
American cookbook writers
Writers from Virginia
21st-century American male writers
People from Annandale, Virginia
21st-century American non-fiction writers
American male non-fiction writers